Me First and the Gimme Gimmes, a punk rock supergroup cover band, has a discography that consists of five studio albums, three EPs, one live album, one compilation album, eighteen singles, one box set, and three music videos.

Me First and the Gimme Gimmes formed in 1995  in California from members of other notable rock bands: Spike Slawson (Swingin' Utters), Chris Shiflett (No Use for a Name, Foo Fighters), Fat Mike (NOFX), and Joey Cape and Dave Raun (Lagwagon). They came together to perform cover songs during off-time from their main acts and did not initially intend to release albums, instead releasing singles named after the artists they had covered and contributing songs to compilation albums. Their first album, Have a Ball, was released in 1997 and began a pattern of themed albums after particular musical genres. Have a Ball covered pop hits of the 1960s and 1970s and was followed by Are a Drag (1999), which covered Broadway show tunes. Blow in the Wind (2001) focused on pop hits of the 1960s, while Take a Break (2003) covered rhythm and blues songs. The band released the live album Ruin Jonny's Bar Mitzvah in 2004 on which they covered karaoke favorites, followed by Love Their Country in 2006 which focused on country and western songs. The compilation album Have Another Ball was released in 2008, consisting of outtakes from the Have a Ball sessions, many of which had appeared on compilations and singles over the years.

Studio albums

Live albums

Compilation albums

Extended plays

Singles 

I Denotes tracks that were re-released on Have Another Ball.

II Denotes tracks that were also released on Have a Ball.

III Bob is exclusive to the Me First and the Gimme Gimmes box set and was not released separately.

IV Dolly, Cash, Willie, Kenny, and Jerry comprise the "Square Dance Series", so named because the first pressing of each was on square-shaped vinyl. The A side tracks on each are songs from Love Their Country, while the B side tracks are outtakes from the album sessions.

Music videos

Box sets

Other appearances 
The following Me First and the Gimme Gimmes songs were released on compilation albums, soundtracks, and other releases. Some songs were later re-released on albums, as noted below. This is not an exhaustive list: songs that were first released on the band's albums, EPs, or singles are not included.

I Denotes songs that were re-released on Have Another Ball.

II "Nothing Compares 2 U" was included on Take a Break in 2003.

References 

Me First and the Gimme Gimmes
Punk rock group discographies
Discographies of American artists